The 2009 Nord LB Open was a professional tennis tournament played on outdoor red clay courts. This was the 16th edition of the tournament which was part of the 2009 ATP Challenger Tour. It took place in Braunschweig, Germany between 29 June and 5 July 2009.

Singles entrants

Seeds

 Rankings are as of June 22, 2009.

Other entrants
The following players received wildcards into the singles main draw:
  Matthias Bachinger
  Jaan-Frederik Brunken
  Florian Mayer
  Dominik Meffert

The following player received entry as a special exempt:
  Julian Reister

The following players received entry from the qualifying draw:
  Federico del Bonis
  Tobias Kamke
  Jan Minář
  Carles Poch-Gradin (as a Lucky Loser)
  Adam Vejmělka

Champions

Singles

 Óscar Hernández def.  Teymuraz Gabashvili, 6–1, 3–6, 6–4

Doubles

 Johan Brunström /  Jean-Julien Rojer def.  Brian Dabul /  Nicolás Massú, 7–6(2), 6–4

References
Official Site

Nord LB Open
Sparkassen Open
2000s in Lower Saxony
2009 in German tennis